Thomas William Darnton Dean  (born 2 May 2000) is a British competitive freestyle swimmer. He is a double Olympic gold medalist, winning gold  individually in 200 metre freestyle and as part of a team in 4 × 200 m freestyle relay at the 2020 Summer Olympics.

He has represented Great Britain at the European Junior Championships and the European Championships. He also competed at the 2020 European Championships where he won three gold and two silver medals in the team events and one individual bronze in 200m freestyle.

Early life
Dean was born to Jacquie Hughes and Jonathan Dean in London, the second of five children. He grew up in Maidenhead, Berkshire, and was a pupil at the Sir William Borlase's Grammar School in Marlow, Buckinghamshire. He took up swimming when he was eight, and joined the Maidenhead Marlins.
He went to study mechanical engineering at the University of Bath in 2018 while training at the National Centre for Swimming in Bath.

Career 
At the 2017 European Junior Championships, Dean won the gold medal in the 200m Individual Medley and the silver medal in the 400m Individual Medley. At the 2018 European Junior Championships, Dean retained the gold medal in the 200m Individual Medley, breaking a European Junior record in the process. He also won two bronze medals, in the 400m Individual Medley and the 4x200m Freestyle relay.

Dean was selected for the British team for the 2018 European Championships, his first senior competition, where he participated in the 200m Individual medley, 400m Individual medley, and won gold as part of the 4x200m freestyle team.

2021 – Olympic gold medals
In May 2021, Dean won gold as part of a team in mixed 4 × 100 metre and mixed 4 × 200 metre freestyle, as well as silver in the men's 4 × 100 metre freestyle and 4 × 200 metre freestyle relays at the European Championships. He also won an individual bronze medal in the 200m freestyle.

On 27 July 2021, at the 2020 Summer Olympic Games in Tokyo, Dean won the gold medal in the 200m freestyle, with his teammate Duncan Scott winning the silver medal. He then won gold in the men's 4 × 200 metre freestyle relay together with James Guy, Duncan Scott, and Matt Richards in a time of six minutes 58.58 seconds. Dean became the first male British swimmer to win two gold Olympic medals at the same games in 113 years, a feat later equalled in the same week by James Guy and Adam Peaty.

Dean was appointed Member of the Order of the British Empire (MBE) in the 2022 New Year Honours for services to swimming.

2022
At the 2022 World Aquatics Championships, Dean won the bronze medal in the 200 metre freestyle with a time of 1:44.98. His bronze medal was the first medal won by a swimmer representing Great Britain at the 2022 World Aquatics Championships. He won his second bronze medal of the Championships in the 4×200 metre freestyle relay, splitting a 1:43.53 for the anchor leg of the relay to finish in a final time of 7:04.00. In the 4×100 metre medley relay he won his third bronze medal of the Championships, helping achieve a third-place finish in the final in 3:31.31 by swimming the anchor leg of the relay in 47.45 seconds.

References

External links
 
 
 
 Tom Dean  at the 2020 Tokyo Olympics

2000 births
Living people
British male swimmers
Place of birth missing (living people)
British male freestyle swimmers
European Aquatics Championships medalists in swimming
European Championships (multi-sport event) gold medalists
Medalists at the 2020 Summer Olympics
Olympic gold medalists in swimming
Olympic gold medallists for Great Britain
Swimmers at the 2020 Summer Olympics
Alumni of the University of Bath
Members of the Order of the British Empire
World Aquatics Championships medalists in swimming
Medalists at the FINA World Swimming Championships (25 m)
Olympic swimmers of Great Britain
Swimmers at the 2022 Commonwealth Games
Commonwealth Games medallists in swimming
Commonwealth Games silver medallists for England
21st-century British people
Sportspeople from Berkshire
People from Maidenhead
Medallists at the 2022 Commonwealth Games